The  Shkodër–Vorë railway was a railway between Shkodër and Vorë in Albania.

The line connected to the Podgorica–Shkodër railway in Shkodër, the uncompleted Milot–Klos railway in Milot and the Durrës–Tiranë railway in Vorë.

Overview 

The Shkodër–Vorë railway is a 103.6 kilometre-long standard gauge railway. Like other railways throughout Albania, the railway is not electrified.

There is a projected railway that is slated to operate from Vorë to the Tirana International Airport Nënë Tereza. However, the project has yet to commence construction.

History 
The 28 kilometre rail line between Vorë and Laç was completed between 1962 and 1963 with the help of volunteers. Raw materials were imported from Morocco, which were then hauled by locomotives from Durrës to Laç. The line officially opened on 7 May 1963.

The 20 kilometre rail line between Laç and Lezhë was completed between 1980 and 1981. The line officially opened in April 1981.

The 34 kilometre rail line between Lezhë and Shkodër was completed between 1981 and 1982. The line officially opened on 11 November 1981, and began passenger services on 25 January 1982.

Stations

References

See also
 Albanian Railways

Railway lines in Albania
Railway lines opened in 1963